Damian Rasak (born 8 February 1996) is a Polish professional footballer who plays as a midfielder for Górnik Zabrze.

References

Living people
1996 births
Sportspeople from Toruń
Association football midfielders
Polish footballers
Poland youth international footballers
Poland under-21 international footballers
Elana Toruń players
A.C. ChievoVerona players
S.E.F. Torres 1903 players
Miedź Legnica players
Wisła Płock players
Górnik Zabrze players
Ekstraklasa players
I liga players
II liga players
Polish expatriate footballers
Expatriate footballers in Italy
Polish expatriate sportspeople in Italy